Events from the year 1606 in art.

Events
May 29 – Caravaggio kills a young man in a brawl in Rome.

Works

Caravaggio
Death of the Virgin (1604-1606)
Madonna di Loreto (1604-1606)
Mary Magdalen in Ecstasy
Portrait of Pope Paul V (1605-1606)
Saint Francis in Prayer
Saint Jerome Writing
Supper at Emmaus (Pinacoteca di Brera, Milan)
John de Critz (attrib.) – James VI and I (approximate date)
Frans Francken the Younger – The Witches' Sabbath
Peter Paul Rubens
The Judgement of Paris (approximate date)
Portrait of Marchesa Brigida Spinola-Doria

Births
February 27 – Laurent de La Hire, French painter (died 1656)
April – Jan Davidsz de Heem, Dutch painter (died 1683)
May 3 – Lorenzo Lippi, Italian painter and poet (died 1664)
May 12 – Joachim von Sandrart, German art-historian and painter (died 1688)
July 15 – Rembrandt, Dutch painter (died 1669)
date unknown
Theodoor van Thulden, Dutch artist from 's-Hertogenbosch in North Brabant (died 1669)
Charles Errard, French painter, architect and engraver (died 1689)
Giacinto Gimignani, Italian painter, active mainly in Rome, during the Baroque period (died 1681)
Giovanni Francesco Grimaldi, Italian architect and painter (died 1680)
Pieter Quast, Dutch painter (died 1647)
Pietro Ricchi, Italian painter of the altarpiece for a church in Lucca (died 1675)
probable
(born 1606/1611): Viviano Codazzi, Italian painter of landscapes or vedute (died 1672)
(born 1606/1608): Johannes Bosschaert, member of the Bosschaert family of still life painters (born 1628/1629)
Joan Carlile, née Palmer, English professional portrait painter (died 1679)
Isaack Gilsemans, Dutch merchant and artist (died 1646)
Anthonie Jansz. van der Croos, Dutch painter (died 1661)

Deaths
August 6 – Ottaviano Nonni, Italian architect, sculptor, and painter (born 1536)
September 2 – Karel van Mander, Flemish painter, poet and biographer (born 1548)
date unknown
Tiziano Aspetti, Italian sculptor (born c.1557/1559)
Andrea Boscoli, Florentine painter (born c.1550/60)
Giovanni Maria Butteri, Italian painter primarily of frescoes (born 1540)
Alessandro Casolano, Italian painter primarily working in Siena (born 1552)
Giovanni Battista Fiammeri, Florentine Jesuit painter (born 1530)
Lodovico Leoni, Italian painter mainly active in Rome (born 1531)
Jan Vermeyen, Dutch goldsmith of the Renaissance Mannerism (born 1559)
probable - Paolo Farinati, Italian painter of the Mannerist style (born 1524)

 
Years of the 17th century in art
1600s in art